The Bardwell's Ferry Bridge, built in 1882, is a historic lenticular truss bridge spanning the Deerfield River between the towns of Shelburne and Conway in Franklin County, Massachusetts. The bridge is listed on the National Register of Historic Places and is designated as a Massachusetts Historic Civil Engineering Landmark by the American Society of Civil Engineers.

Description 

The Bardwell's Ferry Bridge carries Bardwell's Ferry Road across the Deerfield River. The bridge is situated within a deep valley, with sharply sloping roadways on each side.

It is the longest single span lenticular bridge in Massachusetts.

The lower chords are constructed from  eye bars.

During the latter part of the 19th century, the Berlin Iron Bridge Co. manufactured and erected almost 800 lenticular truss bridges in the United States (Darnell 1979). While most of these bridges were built in New England, a few were constructed in Ohio and Texas. These bridges are sometimes referred to as "pumpkin-seed bridges", "cats-eyes bridges", "elliptical truss bridges", or "parabolic truss bridges" because of their unique lens shape. Lenticular bridges were only used for vehicular traffic and were generally considered too light to be used for railroad and trolley loads.

The Bardwell's Ferry Bridge was restored in the 1990s, and added to the National Register of Historic Places in 2000.

See also
List of bridges documented by the Historic American Engineering Record in Massachusetts

References

External links

1998 Federal Highway Administration Award
Photo Essay on Bardwell's Ferry Bridge

Bridges completed in 1880
Road bridges on the National Register of Historic Places in Massachusetts
Truss bridges in the United States
Bridges in Franklin County, Massachusetts
Historic American Engineering Record in Massachusetts
National Register of Historic Places in Franklin County, Massachusetts
1882 establishments in Massachusetts
Conway, Massachusetts